Wang Xinxian (born November 1954) is a Chinese public figure, currently serving as the Director-General of the China Disabled Persons' Federation.  Born in Qin County, Shanxi, he graduated from South China Normal University. He also studied economics at the Central Party School. Wang is disabled. He served on the boards of associations for the disabled in Guangdong province, before joining the China Disabled Persons' Federation in 2003 as a vice chairman, then becoming chairman in October 2008.

Wang is an alternate member of the 17th Central Committee of the Communist Party of China (elected with highest number of confirmation votes), but was elevated to full membership after the expulsion of Yu Youjun, and a full member of the 18th Central Committee.

References

1954 births
Living people
People's Republic of China politicians from Shanxi
Chinese Communist Party politicians from Shanxi
Politicians from Changzhi
Central Party School of the Chinese Communist Party alumni
South China Normal University alumni
People's Republic of China economists
Economists from Shanxi